Babil is a Turkish psychological thriller television series signed by Ay Yapım, the first episode of which was broadcast on 17 January 2020, directed by Uluç Bayraktar, and written by Nükhet Bıçakçı and Özlem Yücel. The series ended with the final in the 20th episode released on 20 November 2020.

Cast and characters

Main characters 
 İrfan Tuna Saygun (Halit Ergenç): An economics professor who does his best for Deniz, whom he thinks is his 7-year-old son.  Ilay's ex.
 Egemen Kıvılcım  (Onur Saylak / Ozan Güven): Irfan's childhood friend and best friend.  Deniz's biological father.
 Ayşe Karaali/Nihal (Aslı Enver): The young girl who confronted İrfan when he was in trouble.  She is the secret police who joined Süleyman to reveal his dark deeds. She later became İrfan and Egemen's assistant.
 İlay Yücedağ (Birce Akalay): Süleyman's love and İrfan's former love.
 Eda Saygun (Nur Fettahoğlu): Irfan's wife, Deniz's mother.
 Süleyman Yavuncu (Mesut Akusta): Kudret's husband. Ilay's lover and dark businessman.
 Deniz Saygun (Beren Kasımoğulları): adoptive son of İrfan, actually Egemen's son.

Supporting characters 
 Hakan Yavuncu (Selahattin Paşalı): Son of Süleyman and Kudret.
 Kudret Yavuncu (Veda Yurtsever): Süleyman's wife, who is very jealous of him.
 Funda (Lesli Karavil): Eda's older sister who knows all her secrets.
 Saffet (Abdurrahman Yunusoğlu): Funda's husband.
 Sedat (Barış Aksavaş): The commissioner who works together with Ayşe/Nihal to end Süleyman.
 Yalçın (Mert Doğan): Süleyman's man.
 Mert (Gürberk Polat): İrfan's student from university.  He does his best to win İrfan's attention.
 Nehir Yücedağ (Gizem Kala): Ilay's younger sister. She blames her sister for what she went through.
 Demet (Gözde Kocaoğlu): Ilay's assistant.
 Büşra (Şeniz Çetin): Kudret's assistant.

Overview

References

External links 
 Babil on Star TV's official site
 Babil on IMDb

Television series by Ay Yapım
Star TV (Turkey) original programming
Turkish drama television series
2020 Turkish television series debuts
Television shows set in Istanbul
2020 Turkish television series endings